Holmberg IX is a dwarf irregular galaxy and a satellite galaxy of M81, located in the constellation of Ursa Major. The galaxy is named after Erik Holmberg who first described it.  Based on the observed age distribution of stars it contains it is thought to have formed within the last 200 Myr making it the youngest nearby galaxy.  It is also home to one of two yellow supergiant eclipsing binary systems.

References

Further reading

External links
 
 M81's satellite galaxy Holmberg IX
 Holmberg IX: XMM1
 GALEX Completes Four Star-Studded Years in Space
 Dwarf Galaxy Holmberg IX
 

Interacting galaxies
Dwarf irregular galaxies
05336
28757
28757
Ursa Major (constellation)
M81 Group